Martin Gibbs (November 11, 1922 – July 24, 2006) was an American biochemist and educator who worked in the field of carbon metabolism. The Martin Gibbs Medal, an award honoring individuals in plant sciences, is named in his honor.

Career
Gibbs was born in Philadelphia, Pennsylvania and educated at the Philadelphia College of Pharmacy. He obtained his Ph.D. from the University of Illinois in 1947. Gibbs went on to work as a scientist at the Brookhaven National Laboratory that same year. 

In 1957, he returned to academia as professor of biochemistry at Cornell University. In 1962, in the midst of his research, he accepted the role as editor-in-chief of Plant Physiology. As editor he focused his strong inclination toward biochemistry on journal manuscripts and was able to significantly grow the journal. He eventually moved on to Brandeis University becoming the Abraham S. and Gertrude Berg Professor of Biology and served as chair of the Department of Biology for three years.

In 1993, the Martin Gibbs Medal, awarded to those who have provided significant contributions in the field of plant sciences, was created by the American Society of Plant Biologists to honor his retirement.

Career related
Consultant National Science Foundation, 1961–64, 1969–1972
National Institutes of Health, 1966–69
Cosmos Club, 1984
Marine Biological Laboratory, 1970
RESA lecturer, 1969
NATO consultant fellowship board, 1968–70
Council International Exchange of Scholars, 1976–82
Chairman of selection committee, Fulbright Scholars for Eastern Europe
Adjunct professor Botanical Institute, University Munster, Federal Republic of Germany, 1978, 1980, 1987
Adjunct professor department botany University California, Riverside, 1979-1989.

Creative works

Author
Structure and Function of Chloroplasts, 1970
Crop Productivity-Research Imperatives, 1975
Crassulacean Acid Metabolism, 1982
Crassulacean Acid Biosynthesis and Function of Plant Lipids, 1983
Crop Productivity-Research Imperative, Revisited, 1985
Hungarian-USA Binational Symposium on Photosynthesis, 1986

Editor-in-chief
Plant Physiology, 1963—92

Associate editor
Physiologie Vegetale, 1966—1976
Annual Review of Plant Physiology, 1966—1971

Awards
Recipient Charles Reid Barnes award, 1984
Alexander von Humboldt Fellow, 1987
Adolph E. Gude award, 1993
Martin Gibbs medal, 1993
University Illinois Achievement award, 1996
Bulgarian Academy Sciences gold medal
Recognized as a Pioneer Member of the American Society of Plant Biologists.

References

External links
The Boston Globe - Obituary
Maarteen J. Chrispeels, "Martin Gibbs", Biographical Memoirs of the National Academy of Sciences (2016)

Cornell University faculty
1922 births
2006 deaths
Members of the French Academy of Sciences
University of the Sciences alumni
University of Illinois alumni
Brookhaven National Laboratory staff
Members of the United States National Academy of Sciences